Meeting in Paris (French: Rencontre à Paris) is a 1956 French comedy film directed by Georges Lampin and starring Robert Lamoureux, Betsy Blair and Jacques Castelot.

The film's sets were designed by the art director Jacques Colombier.

Cast

References

Bibliography
 Parish, James Robert. Film Actors Guide. Scarecrow Press, 1977.

External links
 

1956 films
1956 comedy films
1950s French-language films
French comedy films
Films directed by Georges Lampin
Films set in Paris
1950s French films
French black-and-white films